Zouar Airport  is a public use airport located near Zouar, Tibesti, Chad.

See also
List of airports in Chad

References

External links 
 Airport record for Zouar Airport at Landings.com

Airports in Chad
Tibesti Region